NSI-189 is an experimental, potential antidepressant that was developed by Neuralstem, Inc. for the treatment for major depressive disorder (MDD), as well as for cognitive impairment and neurodegeneration.

A phase II clinical trial for MDD failed to meet the primary depression endpoint in July 2017, although statistically significant improvements have been reported on a number of secondary depression and cognition endpoints.

The compound's activity was discovered using phenotypic screening with a library of 10,269 compounds to identify compounds that promoted neurogenesis in vitro. As of 2016 the target of the compound was unknown but it appeared to promote neurogenesis in rodents.

NSI-189 completed a phase I clinical trial for MDD in 2011, where it was administered to 41 healthy volunteers. A phase Ib clinical trial for treating MDD in 24 patients started in 2012 and completed in July 2014, with results published in December 2015. In July 2017, it was announced that a phase II clinical trial with 220 patients failed to meet its primary effectiveness endpoint in MDD. Upon the announcement, Neuralstem stock plummeted by 61%. More detailed analysis of the trial results was released in December 2017 and January 2018. It revealed statistically significant improvements on patient-reported depression scales and in aspects of cognition for the 40 mg/day dose. Of particular note are improvements in memory (effect size Cohen's d = 1.12, p = 0.002), working memory (d = 0.81, p = 0.020), and executive functioning (d = 0.66, p = 0.048) as measured by the CogScreen computerized test.

In August 2020 another phase 2 study with 220 participants was done. A 80 mg dose of NSI-189 showed significant benefit over placebo in the subgroup of patients who were moderately depressed (MADRS < 30) but was not significant in patients who were severely depressed (MADRS ≥ 30). The study concludes that NSI-189 is effective as a safe adjunctive therapy, with most compelling antidepressant and procognitive benefits noted in patients with moderate depression.

In addition to MDD, Neuralstem has said that it intends to pursue clinical development of NSI-189 for a variety of other neurological conditions, including traumatic brain injury, Alzheimer's disease, post-traumatic stress disorder, stroke, and to prevent cognitive and memory decline in aging.

In 2021, Neuralstem merged with another company to become Palisade Bio, who in 2021 sold NSI-189 to an unknown buyer for up to $4.9 million.

See also
 List of investigational antidepressants

References

External links
 

Antidepressants
Drugs with unknown mechanisms of action
Nicotinamides
Nootropics
Piperazines
Aminopyridines